Muzeum Sztuki Nowoczesnej w Warszawie is a museum in Warsaw, Poland. It was established in 2005.

Until the construction of its new museum, the Museum of Modern Art in Warsaw carries out its program activities in a temporary premises Museum at Pańska (office spaces at ul. Pańska 3) and the Museum over Vistula pavillion (exhibition space at Wybrzeże Kościuszkowskie 22). The Director of the museum since June 6, 2007 has been Joanna Mytkowska.

The construction of the new museum 

In 2006, an international architectural competition for the design of the museum was announced. The competition was won in February 2007 by Swiss architect Christian Kerez. It was chosen from 109 designs.

The building of about 30,000 square meters was to be completed from 2012-2016 on the northern side of Parade Square beside Marszałkowska Street (previously occupied by a marketplace).

In April, 2008 the President of Warsaw, Hanna Gronkiewicz-Waltz and Christian Kerez signed a contract for the design of the museum. In summer 2008, Warsaw authorities decided to change the functional program and project of the inside of the building, and as a result, the project had undergone significant change, and design work had to be significantly extended. The final concept of the building was to have been presented in the summer of 2010. However, in May 2012, the City terminated the contract with Christian Kerez.

At the same time it was decided that for the next three years the temporary location for the museum would be in Pańska Street, off the nearby main thoroughfare Emilii Plater.

Current plans are to open the new custom-built museum in 2023, located on the northern side of Plac Defilad (city center). The new Museum building was designed by the New York City-based architecture studio Thomas Phifer and Partners, chosen in the two-stage tender proceeding in 2013-14.

Museum programming 

The museum presents the achievements and changes in Polish art of the twentieth and twenty-first century in an international context, creates an art collection, presents significant phenomena in the field of visual arts, film, theater and music, as well as supports exceptionally talented artists.

The museum acts as a platform for dialogue between tradition and the new currents, which allows for constant renewal of the historical memory of the "near" and to negotiate the changing social hierarchy of values in the wider culture.

The museum – open for art in the broadest sense – is geared to interact with many diverse circles of Polish society, and to communicate with the public and international artistic circles.

The collection, exhibition time, as well as a multimedia program is supported by information and education addressed to a number of social and age groups, with particular emphasis on high schools and universities.

The activities of the museum serve to raise the level of knowledge and interest in the arts with references to tradition and history, and develop and promote international cooperation with a view to forming a European cultural identity. This applies to both the new museum and artistic and scientific exchanges with artists and people working in the area of culture – art historians, exhibitions curators, art critics – as well as participation in international museum artwork circuits and projects in the area of contemporary culture. Thanks to its unique locations (of all three – Museum at Pańska, Museum over Vistula as well as the future seat) and historical surroundings the museum aims to stimulate intercultural dialogue.

The attractiveness of the new building, combined with a favorable location and dynamics of the museum will be used to create a space for recreation and leisure for residents of and visitors to the city of Warsaw.

See also 

 The Zachęta National Gallery of Art
 The Centre for Contemporary Art

References

External links
 
 

Modern Art
Art museums established in 2005
Art museums and galleries in Poland
Modern art museums